Qarib ibn Abd Allah known as Qarib Mawla al-Hussain, was killed in the Battle of Karbala.

Lineage 
"Fakiha", Qarib's mother was Hussain ibn Ali's maid who worked in the house of Rabab, the wife of Hussain. Hussain ibn Ali asked her to marry Abd Allah Urayqit and after marriage, she gave birth to Qarib; therefore, Qarib was considered Hussain ibn Ali's servant. Qarib's father, "Abd Allah b. Urayqit" was the Prophet's guide in immigration to Medina. 

Fakiha was also present in the event of Karbala and was among the Captives of Karbala.

In the Battle of Karbala 
When Hussain declined to offer allegiance (baya) to Yazid, he decided to left Medina. In Imam's journey from Medina to Mecca and from there to Karbala, Qarib accompanied him. It is said that he was killed in the first attack of the enemy, before the noon of Ashura. 

In the Ziyarah al-shuhada, it is mentioned: "Peace be upon Qarib, servant of Hussain b. Ali".

References 

Husayn ibn Ali
Hussainiya
680 deaths
People killed at the Battle of Karbala